Newtown Limavady was a constituency represented in the Irish House of Commons until 1800.

Members of Parliament
1613-1615 Sir Christopher Sibthorpe  and Roger Downton
1634–1635 Arthur Newcome and George Downing 
1639–1649 Dudley Philips and John Usher 
1661–1666 George Philips and Sir Richard Gethin, 1st Baronet

1692–1801

Notes

References

Constituencies of the Parliament of Ireland (pre-1801)
Historic constituencies in County Londonderry
Limavady
1800 disestablishments in Ireland
Constituencies disestablished in 1800